The Welsh Football League Challenge Cup (known as the Huws Gray Cup for sponsorship reasons) was a knock-out competition for all members of the three divisions that made up the Cymru Alliance in north Wales.

List of winners

Performance by club

References

1990 establishments in Wales
Cyrmu Alliance League Cup
Recurring sporting events established in 1990
Defunct football competitions in Wales